The Forty-second Oklahoma Legislature was a meeting of the legislative branch of the government of Oklahoma, composed of the Senate and the House of Representatives. It met in Oklahoma City from January 3, 1989, to January 8, 1991, during the term of Governor Henry Bellmon. In 1989, a ballot question designated the sine die adjournment day, or last day of session, as the last Friday in May. Combined with the 90-day requirement, this moved the session start day to February, leaving the original start day in January as an organizational day.

Dates of sessions
First regular session: January 3-May 26, 1989
Special sessions: 46 days spanning August 14, 1989 – May 2, 1990
Second regular session: February 5-May 25, 1990
Previous: 41st Legislature • Next: 43rd Legislature

Party composition

Senate

House of Representatives

Major legislation

Enacted
Education - HB 1017 was an education reform package enacted by the state legislature after Governor Henry Bellmon called for the longest special session in state history.

Leadership

Senate
Democratic State Senator Robert V. Cullison served as President pro tempore of the Oklahoma Senate.

Democratic State Senator Darryl F. Roberts served as Majority Leader of the Oklahoma Senate

House of Representatives

Democratic leadership
Jim Barker served as Speaker of the Oklahoma House of Representatives during the first regular session in 1989, but was ousted on May 17, 1989, due to political infighting. He was replaced by Steve Lewis, who served during the special and second regular sessions.

Republican leadership
Joe Heaton served as Republican Minority leader.

Members

Senate

Table based on state almanac.

House of Representatives

Table based on government database.

References

Oklahoma legislative sessions
1989 in Oklahoma
1990 in Oklahoma
1989 U.S. legislative sessions
1990 U.S. legislative sessions